Lee and Lowry Hall, originally known as the Structural Science Building, is a historic academic building located on the campus of Clemson University, Clemson, Pickens County, South Carolina.  It was designed by Harlan Ewart McClure, Dean of the College of Architecture, and completed in 1958.  It consists of three building elements that enclose two courtyards: the Civil Engineering Wing, the Mechanical Engineering Laboratories, and the Architecture Wing.  The buildings are in the International Style.

It was listed on the National Register of Historic Places in 2010.

References 

Clemson University campus
University and college buildings on the National Register of Historic Places in South Carolina
Buildings and structures completed in 1958
National Register of Historic Places in Pickens County, South Carolina